The 1829 Alabama gubernatorial election was an uncontested election held on August 3, 1829, to elect the governor of Alabama. Jacksonian candidate Gabriel Moore ran unopposed and so won 100% of the vote.

General election

Candidates
Gabriel Moore, member of the U.S. House of Representatives for Alabama from 1821 to 1829.

Results

References

Alabama gubernatorial elections
Alabama
1829 Alabama elections
August 1829 events